Vance Juano Bedford (born August 20, 1958) is an American football coach who last served as defensive coordinator at the University of Texas at Austin for head coach Charlie Strong. He was previously the defensive coordinator at the University of Louisville, where he also served under head coach Charlie Strong. He had served as defensive back coach at the University of Florida under Urban Meyer. He previously served as defensive backs coach under Lloyd Carr at the University of Michigan. He served in that same position for six seasons with the Chicago Bears, and also served two seasons as defensive coordinator at Oklahoma State University-Stillwater.

Bedford was born in Beaumont, Texas. He played high-school football at Hebert High School, where his father, Leon Bedford, was coach and he was an all-District player for the first all-black high school in Texas to win a University Interscholastic League state title.

He played college football at the University of Texas at Austin where he was a four-year letterman and starter at cornerback as well as the defensive captain. He was a two-time All-Southwest Conference second team selection. He played in two Cotton Bowls and two Sun Bowls. He set a then-Longhorn season record for pass breakups with 22 in 1981 and is currently in the top ten on UT's career pass breakup list (47). At the end of his senior year, he was named a Defensive Valuable Player in the 1982 Senior Bowl All-Star Game. He returned to Texas to receive his diploma in 1984.

Bedford was selectedin the fifth round of the 1982 NFL Draft by the St. Louis Cardinals. He played one season for the Cardinals and later played for Oklahoma Outlaws of the United States Football League (USFL) in 1984.

Vance participates in The Michigan Insider's  film study, providing game-by-game breakdowns, analysis, and opinions of The University of Michigan defense.

External links
 Texas profile
 

1958 births
Living people
American football cornerbacks
Chicago Bears coaches
Colorado State Rams football coaches
Florida Gators football coaches
Louisville Cardinals football coaches
Michigan Wolverines football coaches
Oklahoma Outlaws players
Oklahoma State Cowboys football coaches
St. Louis Cardinals (football) players
Texas Longhorns football coaches
Texas Longhorns football players
High school football coaches in Texas
People from Beaumont, Texas
Coaches of American football from Texas
Players of American football from Texas
African-American coaches of American football
African-American players of American football
20th-century African-American sportspeople
21st-century African-American sportspeople